Horithyatira decorata is a moth in the family Drepanidae. It is found from the north-eastern Himalaya and Nepal to southern China and Taiwan.

Subspecies
Horithyatira decorata decorata (Nepal, Bhutan, Myanmar, India, Vietnam, China: Shaanxi, Hubei, Hainan, Guangdong, Guangxi, Sichuan, Guizhou, Yunnan, Tibet)
Horithyatira decorata kawamurae (Matsumura, 1921) (Japan)
Horithyatira decorata takamukui (Matsumura, 1921) (Taiwan)

References

Moths described in 1881
Thyatirinae
Moths of Asia